Herzogspitalkirche  (German: "St. Elisabeth Hospital") is a Catholic church in Munich, southern Germany.

Damaged during  World War II, the Duke Hospital was demolished and replaced by a new building.

References

External links

Photo spread of Herzogspitalkirche

Former churches in Munich
Baroque architecture in Munich
Cultural heritage monuments in Munich